Paul David Edward Shepherd (born 17 November 1977) is an English former professional footballer who played as a full-back.
On 17 June 2021, at Leeds Crown Court, Shepherd was found guilty of four charges relating to possessing a firearm and Class A drugs after a three-day trial 

Whilst at Leeds he made one first team appearance in October 1996; a 3–0 defeat away to Arsenal at Highbury. He was a part of the England squad at the 1997 FIFA World Youth Championship.

References

External links

Paul Shepherd at Leeds-Fans.org.uk
Paul Shepherd at StalybridgeCeltic.co.uk

1977 births
Living people
Footballers from Leeds
Association football fullbacks
English footballers
England youth international footballers
Leeds United F.C. players
Ayr United F.C. players
Knattspyrnudeild Keflavík players
Tranmere Rovers F.C. players
Scunthorpe United F.C. players
Luton Town F.C. players
Oldham Athletic A.F.C. players
Scarborough F.C. players
Leigh Genesis F.C. players
Harrogate Town A.F.C. players
Stalybridge Celtic F.C. players
Premier League players
English Football League players
National League (English football) players
English expatriate footballers